Sarv may refer to:
 Sarv, Fars
 Sarv, Hormozgan
 Sarv, South Khorasan
 Sarv, Mahabad, West Azerbaijan Province
 Sarv, Yazd
 Sarv-e Olya, Yazd Province
 Sarv-e Sofla, Yazd Province
 Serow, Iran, a city in West Azerbaijan Province

See also 
 SARV, an Iranian military programme
 Sarva (disambiguation)